The Sea Sprite 34, also called the Luders 34, is  an American sailboat that was designed by Bill Luders as a cruiser and first built in 1980.

The design is the largest of the series of Sea Sprite Sailing Yachts.

Production
The design was built by C. E. Ryder in Bristol, Rhode Island, United States. The company completed 45 examples, but it is now out of production.

Design
The Sea Sprite 34 is a recreational keelboat, built predominantly of fiberglass, with wood trim. It has a fractional sloop rig, with a keel-stepped mast, a spooned raked stem, a raised transom, a keel-mounted rudder controlled by a wheel and a fixed long keel. It displaces  and carries  of lead ballast.

The boat's galley is located on the port side of the cabin and includes a stainless steel sink and a two-burner stove. The head is located forward, just aft of the bow "V"-berth. Additional sleeping space is provided by the dinette settees. Ventilation is provided by a forward hatch.

See also
List of sailing boat types

Related development
Sea Sprite 27

Similar sailboats
Beneteau 331
Beneteau First Class 10
C&C 34
C&C 34/36
Catalina 34
Coast 34
Columbia 34
Columbia 34 Mark II
Creekmore 34
Crown 34
CS 34
Express 34
Hunter 34
San Juan 34
S&S 34
Sun Odyssey 349
Tartan 34-2
UFO 34
Viking 34

References

External links

Keelboats
1980s sailboat type designs
Sailing yachts
Sailboat type designs by Bill Luders
Sailboat types built by C. E. Ryder